Stop Jap is the second album by Japanese hardcore punk band The Stalin, released on July 1, 1982. In September 2007, Rolling Stone Japan rated Stop Jap #27 on their list of the 100 greatest Japanese rock albums of all time. It was named number 22 on Bounces 2009 list of 54 Standard Japanese Rock Albums.

The first pressing contained a lyric sheet for "Meat" and was pressed on red vinyl. An additional cover of The Doors' "Light My Fire" and The Stooges' song "No Fun" was available on the cassette version that had been released at the same time.

Stop Jap was The Stalin's second full-length album. It was, contrary to the album Trash, easy to purchase right from the start. This was due to the efforts of Tokuma Onkou, the new record label The Stalin signed to. Some of the tracks on the album are old tracks with different titles and adapted lyrics.

Track listing

Credits

Band members 
Michiro Endo – vocals
Kazuo "Tam" Tamura – guitar
Shintaro Sugiyama – bass
Jun Inui – drums

Staff/crew 
Mikio Moriwaki – producer
Masafumi Kato – director

References

The Stalin albums
1982 albums